Spondylocamptodactyly, also known as Spondylocamptodactyly syndrome, is a very rare multi-systemic genetic disorder which is characterized by the presence of camptodactyly, flattened vertebrae and thoracic scoliosis of varying degrees. It has been described in 5 members of a 3-generation Mexican family, It is thought to be inherited in an either autosomal dominant or autosomal recessive with pseudodominance pattern.

References 

Genetic diseases and disorders